Carex festucacea, or fescue sedge, is a species of sedge that lives in eastern North America. It has been described as "a soft, gray green, wisp, to 2', with narrow leaves and somewhat taller stems, topped by an interrupted spike, with lower spikelets, shaped a bit like an overflowing ice cream cone. The spike axis is often arched at the summit, but the alternating spikelets around the axis create a zig zag appearance. The seed sacs have a humped shoulder."

References

External links
Carex festucacea, Flora of North America

festucacea
Plants described in 1805
Flora of North America